Preziosa (minor planet designation: 529 Preziosa) is a minor planet orbiting the Sun that was discovered by German astronomer Max Wolf on 20 March 1904 from Heidelberg.

This is a member of the dynamic Eos family of asteroids that were probably formed as the result of a collisional breakup of a parent body.

The name is that of the protagonist of one of Miguel de Cervantes's Exemplary Novels. It is possible, since this was a period when Wolf habitually named his comets after operatic heroines, that he specifically had in mind the Preziosa in the eponymous opera by Antonio Smareglia.

References

External links 
 
 

000529
Discoveries by Max Wolf
Named minor planets
529 Preziosa
000529
19040320